The 1992 Liège–Bastogne–Liège was the 78th edition of the Liège–Bastogne–Liège cycle race and was held on 19 April 1992. The race started in Liège and finished in Ans. The race was won by Dirk De Wolf of the Gatorade team.

General classification

References

1992
1992 in Belgian sport
1992 in road cycling
1992 UCI Road World Cup
April 1992 sports events in Europe